Nallen is a surname. Notable people with the surname include:

Chris Nallen (born 1982), American golfer
James Nallen (born 1973), Irish Gaelic footballer
John Nallen (1932–2019), Irish Gaelic footballer

See also
Allen (surname)